John Maxwell (1824–1895) was an Irish businessman, publisher and property developer in London. He is known for his weekly magazines containing fiction and gossip aimed at a working-class audience, which he ran while also cultivating upmarket readers with monthly publications.

Life
Maxwell was from Ulster, an orphan from a Limerick family, and came to London around 1842, attempting to have Gerald Griffin's poetry published. In the 1850s he was in business in London, selling newspapers and advertising space in them.

From 1858 Maxwell founded a series of newspapers, beginning that year with Town Talk which lasted for 18 months, followed by The Welcome Guest from 1859, bought from Henry Vizetelly and loss-making as a 1d. weekly but relaunched as Robin Goodfellow at 2d. Temple Bar from the end of 1860 was a successful monthly but Maxwell, in partnership by then with Robert Maxwell, lost control of it. He survived a financial crisis in 1862, supported by the earnings of the author Mary Elizabeth Braddon, with whom he was living.

Maxwell continued as a publisher, in particular of reprint fiction.

Maxwell also developed property in Richmond, where he and Braddon lived at Lichfield House. Two nearby streets that he developed are named after characters in Braddon's novels.

Family
Maxwell married twice. With his first wife, Mary Anne Crowley, whom he married in 1848, he had at least five surviving children. She was later confined to a lunatic asylum, after the birth of their seventh child, dying in 1874. He then married Mary Elizabeth Braddon. The actor Gerald Melbourne Maxwell, author W. B. Maxwell and barrister Edward Henry Harrington Maxwell were her sons.

Notes and references

1824 births
1895 deaths
19th-century Irish businesspeople
Irish newspaper publishers (people)
Real estate and property developers
Richmond, London